Death Before Musick by Amen was released on EatUrMusic/Columbia/Sony on April 13, 2004.  The album continues the hardcore and punk genres of previous albums and draws on heavy metal as influence. The album spawned the hit single and promotional video for "California's Bleeding."  Drummer Luke Johnson, who joined the band around the time of the album's release and tour, appeared with the band in the photo shoot in the album's booklet but did not play on the album. This ended up being their last release in over 18 years as the band went on hiatus and had several personnel changes.

Track listing
All tracks by Casey Chaos.

Credits

Personnel
Casey Chaos – vocals
Rich Jones – lead guitar
Matt Montgomery – rhythm guitar
Scott S. Sorry – bass
Shannon Larkin – drums

Production
Daron Malakian – executive production, A&R
Matt Chidgey – mixing
Mike Fraser – mixing
George Marino – mastering
Jon Pikus – A&R
Freddy Sipowicz – assistant mixing
Joe Barresi – mixing

References

Amen (American band) albums
2004 albums
Albums produced by Daron Malakian